Pinzi (Pinji: Apinji, Gapinji) is a Bantu language of Gabon.

References

Languages of Gabon
Tsogo languages